California is an abandoned rapid transit station in the East Garfield Park neighborhood of Chicago, Illinois. It is located in the median of the Eisenhower Expressway, The station served the Chicago Transit Authority's Congress Line, which is now part of the Blue Line. California opened on June 22, 1958, and closed on September 2, 1973, as part of a group of budget-related CTA station closings.

Image Gallery

References

External links
Boarded up entrance to California CTA Congress Line Station from Google Maps Street View

Railway stations in the United States opened in 1958
Railway stations closed in 1973
1958 establishments in Illinois
1973 disestablishments in Illinois
Defunct Chicago "L" stations